Kickininee Provincial Park is a provincial park in British Columbia, Canada, located just south of the town of 
Summerland in that province's Okanagan region.  
the park today comprises approximately 48.76 ha.

References

Provincial parks of British Columbia
Provincial parks in the Okanagan
1970 establishments in British Columbia
Protected areas established in 1970